Dietikon is the fifth biggest city of the canton of Zürich in Switzerland, after Zürich, Winterthur, Uster and Dübendorf. It is the capital of the same-named district of Dietikon and part of the Zürich metropolitan area.

Geography 

Here and in the neighboring region, Spreitenbach, is also the large Limmattal rail freight marshalling yard.

Of this area, 17.2% is used for agricultural purposes, while 27% is forested. Of the rest of the land, 49.1% is settled (buildings or roads) and the remainder (6.7%) is non-productive (rivers, glaciers or mountains).   housing and buildings made up 33.8% of the total area, while transportation infrastructure made up the rest (15.3%). Of the total unproductive area, water (streams and lakes) made up 4.9% of the area.   40.7% of the total municipal area was undergoing some type of construction.

The largest and best known forests of the municipality include the Honeret, Guggenbüehl and Röhrenmoos.

The Honeret forest lies on a side moraine of the Linth glacier ("Linthgletscher"). The Honeret and the Guggenbüehl-Wald are separated by only one main street. In the forest, there are a few springs from which the brooks Tobelbach and Stoffelbach rise and then flow down into the Reppisch. Also in the forest lies the forest cottage "Lorenzhütte."

The Guggenbüehl forest lies wholly within Dietikon. Within the forest lies the "Giigelibode" pond. It has neither inflow nor outflow. A Vita course is in the forest.

Transportation

The municipality is located on the A3 motorway.

Dietikon railway station and Glanzenberg railway station are stops of the S-Bahn Zürich on the lines S3 and S12. Dietikon railway station is also the terminus of the line S17 provided by the Bremgarten-Dietikon-Bahn.

Between 1900 and 1928, Dietikon was the terminus of the Limmattal tramway from Zürich. The, now under construction, Limmattal light rail line will follow a similar alignment, albeit extended through Dietikon to Killwangen.

Waters 
Important running waters that flow through Dietikon are the Limmat and its tributary Reppisch. The Schäflibach is created with the flows together from Allmendbach and Stockacherbach and leads into the Limmat. The Teischlibach originates from Röhrenmoos in the forest above Dietikon and also leads into the Limmat. The Marmoriweiher lies in the Grunschen a place used for gaming and grilling. The Marmoriweiher is an artificial pond, that was positioned for the water supply of the fire brigade. For this, a distraction canal was built with the Grunschen. Later, the pond of a marble factory served. This gave it its name.

History 

Dietikon is first mentioned in 1100 as Dietinchovin. Dietikon features several Roman ruins and also the Fahr Benedictine Convent, given by the House of Regensberg around 1130 AD, with a cloister church dating from the years 1743 to 1746. The Second Battle of Zürich was fought in Dietikon (September 1799) and the town name is among those inscribed at the pillar of the Arc de Triomphe in Paris, France.

Politics 
City president is Roger Bachmann (SVP).

Demographics 

, 39.8% of the population was made up of foreign nationals.   the gender distribution of the population was 50% male and 50% female. Over the last 10 years the population has grown at a rate of 10.5%. Most of the population speaks German (73.9%), with Italian being second most common (8.9%) and Albanian being third (3.8%).

In the 2007 election the most popular party was the SVP which received 40.1% of the vote.  The next three most popular parties were the SPS (19.9%), the CVP (13.7%) and the FDP (8%).

The age distribution of the population is children and teenagers (0–19 years old) make up 21.3% of the population, while adults (20–64 years old) make up 64.7% and seniors (over 64 years old) make up 14%. In Dietikon about 60.1% of the population (between age 25-64) have completed either non-mandatory upper secondary education or additional higher education (either university or a Fachhochschule).  There are 9,892 households in Dietikon.

Dietikon has an unemployment rate of 4.2%.  , there were 179 people employed in the primary economic sector and about 13 businesses involved in this sector.  2,613 people are employed in the secondary sector and there are 213 businesses in this sector.  10,632 people are employed in the tertiary sector, with 957 businesses in this sector.   60.6% of the working population were employed full-time, and 39.4% were employed part-time.

 there were 8,655 Catholics and 4,599 Protestants in Dietikon. From the 2000 census, 26.5% were some type of Protestant, with 24.6% belonging to the Swiss Reformed Church and 1.9% belonging to other Protestant churches.  41.8% of the population were Catholic. Of the rest of the population, 12.2% were Muslim, 16.1% belonged to another religion (not listed), 4.6% did not give a religion, and 9.4% were atheist or agnostic.

The historical population is given in the following table:

Economics and education 
Among other companies, the Limmattaler Zeitung newspaper and Ex Libris are situated in Dietikon.

Weather 
Dietikon has an average of 132.2 days of rain per year and on average receives  of precipitation. During the wettest month, there is precipitation for an average of 12.7 days.

Visitor attractions 
There's the Bruno Weber Park in Dietikon respectively Spreitenbach, one of the few sculpture gardens and Gesamtkunstwerks in Switzerland. Glanzenberg was once a settlement along the river Limmat, but its fortifications seem to never have been completed, and it might have been destroyed in 1267/68, a legend tells. Its remains are to be found in a little forest along the Limmat, opposite the railway station of the same name. Also situated there are the walls of the former Glanzenberg castle, built in the late 12th century AD by the Counts of Regensberg.

Notable people 

 Bruno Weber (1931-2011) an artist and architect, specializing in fantastic realism
 Peter Schweri (1939-2016) artist, painter, illustrator, photographer and music composer
 Peter Vetsch (born 1943) an architect, known for building earth houses
 Urs Fischbacher (born 1959) an economist and professor of applied economic research at the University of Konstanz
 Markus Notter (born 1960) politician and former city president
 Josef Wiederkehr (born 1970) a businessman and politician 
 Diamá (born 1980) also known as Claudia D'Addio, a singer, grew up in Dietikon

Twin towns 

Dietikon is twinned with the towns of

Gallery

References

External links 
 Official website 
 

 
Cities in Switzerland
Municipalities of the canton of Zürich